Adamek is a surname. Notable people with the surname include:

 Andrzej Adamek (born 1972), Polish basketball player and coach
 Donna Adamek (born 1957), American tenpin bowler 
 Józef Adamek (1900–1974), Polish footballer 
 Karl Adamek (1910–2000), Austrian footballer and manager
 Klaudia Adamek (born 1999), Polish athlete
 Marian Adámek (born 1997), Czech ice hockey defenceman
 Mark Adamek (born 1982), American professional ice hockey defenceman
 Mieczysław Adamek (1918–1944), Polish fighter ace of the Polish Air Force in World War II
 Miroslav Adámek (1957-2002), Czech painter, graphic artist and illustrator
 Tomasz Adamek (born 1976), Polish professional heavyweight boxer

See also 
 Adamec, spelling variation
 Adamiec, Polish equivalent of Adamec

References 

West Slavic-language surnames
Polish-language surnames
pl:Adamek (ujednoznacznienie)